Several stratigraphic units in Colombia have provided fossils. The richest formations are the Devonian Cuche and Floresta Formations, the Cretaceous Paja Formation, the Paleocene Cerrejón Formation and the Miocene La Venta site. The latter is the richest Konzentrat-Lagerstätte in northern South America and comprises the formations of the Honda Group.



Fossiliferous stratigraphic units 

Formations are ordered according to their youngest age

Proposed reclassification of South American gomphotheres 

Some authors, Lucas, Mothé, Avilla et al., propose a reclassification of the South American gomphotheres as follows:
 Stegomastodon  is an exclusively North American genus
 Haplomastodon  is a South American genus, but synonymous with Notiomastodon 
 as Notiomastodon was defined earlier, all Haplomastodon species should be considered part of Notiomastodon
 all formerly described species as Stegomastodon sp., Haplomastodon sp. and Notiomastodon sp. belong to a single species; Notiomastodon platensis
 Cuvieronius  is the only remaining South American genus outside of Notiomastodon

Evolution 
 Lucas (2010, 2013) proposes that Notiomastodon evolved from Cuvieronius inside South America
 Mothé et al. (2012, 2015, 2016) propose that Notiomastodon and Cuvieronius reached South America in two separate migration waves

See also 

 List of fossiliferous stratigraphic units in Venezuela
 List of mining areas in Colombia
 South American land mammal age
 Gomphothere fossils in Colombia
 Geology of Colombia
 Geology of the Ocetá Páramo
 Geology of the Altiplano Cundiboyacense
 Geology of the Eastern Hills of Bogotá

Notes and references

Notes

References

Bibliography

Pleistocene-Holocene

Cocinetas Basin

Honda Group

Bogotá Formation

Cerrejón Formation

La Frontera Formation

Paja Formation

Murca Formation

Jurassic

Cuche & Floresta Formations

Cambro-Ordovician

Other formations

South American gomphotheres

External links 

  Paleontología en Colombia

.Colombia
 
 
 
 
 
 
 
 
 
 
 
 
 
Fossils
Fossil